The 1899 America's Cup was the 10th challenge for the Cup. It took place in the New York City harbor and consisted of a best of five series of races between the defender, Columbia, entered by the New York Yacht Club, and Sir Thomas Lipton's Shamrock, representing the Royal Ulster Yacht Club. Columbia won all three races against Shamrock.

Guglielmo Marconi transmitted the event on radio from New York Harbor, making the cup perhaps the first sports broadcasting.

References

America's Cup regattas
America's Cup
America's Cup